is a railway station operated by JR West in Yamaguchi, Yamaguchi.

Lines
The station is served by the Yamaguchi Line. The limited express Super Oki and rapid sightseeing train SL Yamaguchi (steam train) also stop here.

Adjacent stations

History
The station opened on 20 February 1913, as Yuda station. The name was changed to its current name on 20 March 1961. The station operation was taken over by JR West on 1 April 1987, after the privatization of the Japanese National Railways.

External links
Official website 

Railway stations in Japan opened in 1913
Railway stations in Yamaguchi Prefecture
Stations of West Japan Railway Company